Maidenwell is a rural town and locality in the South Burnett Region, Queensland, Australia.

History
Pioneer settler John King dug the first well in the district, hence the name Maidenwell.

Maidenwell Post Office opened in 1906 (a receiving office named Pinpinbugie had been open from 1900) and closed in 1978.

Peron State School opened on 1 April 1914. In 1934, it was moved to the foot of the Maidenwell Range and was then known as Maidenwell State School. It closed on 18 March 1938. In 1949, the school was relocated to its current location in Pimpimbudgee and renamed Tanduringie State School.

Tureen State School opened in March 1915 and closed in June 1925.

Tandaringie State School opened on 15 April 1915. It closed in December 1932.

Maidenwell Provisional School opened on 24 January 1921. On 16 May 1923, it became Maidenwell State School. In 1923, it was renamed Pimpimbudgee State School. It closed on 29 July 1946.

Maidenwell Provisional School opened in April 1926. In 1934, a new school building was constructed and was opened as Wengenville State School. It closed in 1961.

The Maidenwell Community Library opened in 2000.

Heritage listings
Maidenwell has a number of heritage-listed sites, including:
 Maidenwell-Cooyar Road: former King's Boarding House

Amenities 
The Maidenwell branch of the Queensland Country Women's Association meets at the CWA Hall in Pool Street. The South Burnett Regional Council operates a library at the CWA Hall.

Attractions
Coomba Falls is located about 2 kilometres east of the town. There is a deep cold pool at the base of the falls surrounded by granite cliffs. It is a popular tourist spot for picnicking, swimming, birdwatching and photography.

References

Towns in Queensland
South Burnett Region
Localities in Queensland